Sherri is a given name, and may refer to:

 Sherri Baier, former Canadian pairs figure skater
 Sherri Coale (born 1965), current women's basketball coach for the University of Oklahoma Sooners
 Sherri DuPree (born 1983), vocalist, guitarist and lyricist for the band Eisley
 Sherri Field (born 1972), former field hockey player
 Sherri Finkbine (born 1942), American television actress
 Sherri Howard (born 1962), former American athlete
 Sherri Mandel, American journalist and literary professor
 Sherri Martel (1958–2007), American professional wrestler and valet
 Sherri Rasmussen (1957–1986), American murder victim
 Sherri Saum (born 1974), American Daytime Emmy nominated actress
 Sherri Shepherd (born 1967), American comedian and actress
 Sherri Steinhauer (born 1962), American golfer
 Sherri Stoner (born 1965), American actress and writer
 Sherri Sylvester (born 1959), longtime entertainment reporter
 Sherri Turner (born 1956), professional golfer
 Sherri Youngward, Christian praise and worship artist

Fictional characters 
 Sherri and Terri fictional characters in The Simpsons''

See also
 Chari (disambiguation)
 Cheri (disambiguation)
 Cherie
 Cherri (disambiguation)
 Cherrie
 Cherry (disambiguation)
 Shari (disambiguation)
 Sheri
 Sherie
 Sherrie
 Sherry (disambiguation)
 Shery